Forest Heights Collegiate Institute (FHCI), shortened as Forest Heights or simply Forest, is a high school in Kitchener, Ontario, Canada that was established in 1964. It is run by the Waterloo Region District School Board (WRDSB). As of the 2019–2020 school year, Forest Heights has 1,110 students.

FHCI serves the youth of the Northwest Kitchener, ON by “receiving its students from A.R. Kaufman Public School, Laurentian Senior Public School, MacGregor Senior Public School, Queensmount Public School and Westheights Public School.”  The school draws many of its students from the Forest Heights neighbourhood for which it was named, as well as the adjacent neighbourhood of Forest Hill.

History 
In 2016, a vice principal of Forest Heights was charged with sexual interference and sexual assault. The vice principal was also an administrator for the Waterloo Region District School Board. On 22 November 2021, students from the school were banned from entering a nearby shopping plaza during school hours, due to "incidents".

Motto and colours 
The school motto is "sit tuum tollere", meaning "Yours to hold high".. “This motto encourages “students to take the lead in developing these qualities within themselves as important, contributing members of society.”The mascot is a Trojan warrior, which symbolizes a collection of allies fighting together using bravery, courage, and innovation. The mascot has recently been named “Troy the Trojan” by the students attending the school. The official school colours are gold and brown, but black is used in the sports uniforms and school clothing because brown pigments are not regularly used for such products. While this hold true, students attending will say that the school colours are gold, black, and white. These three colours are commonly used for event decorations, posters, announcements, and sports uniforms.

Programs offered 
Forest Heights has become a magnet school for English as a Second Language (ESL) students, as a result of the restructuring of Waterloo Region District School Board (WRDSB) schools. Each district school functions as a magnet for a specific aspect of schooling (i.e. design & technology, ESL, creative arts).

The school is host to many magnet and specialized programs which support the academic journey of the students at Forest Heights. These programs include: “The Innovate Program, the Forest Heights Collegiate English Literacy Development (ELD) Program, the Forest Heights Collegiate English as a Second Language (ESL) Program, the Extended French Magnet Program, ACE (the Alternative Education Program), and Specialist High School Major (SHSM) Program.”.

Academic performance 
In regard to the 9th grade math courses, 45.00% of students are enrolled in the academic math course and 55.00% of students are enrolled in the applied math course. The grade 9 EQAO Mathematics Assessment traditionally occurs in the month of January during a standard academic year. Approximately 85.00% of students in the academic math course have achieved a grade of level 3 or higher on this examination, . Approximately 43.00% of students in the applied math course have achieved a grade of level 3 or higher on this examination, .

The Ontario Secondary School Literacy Test (OSSLT) examination traditionally takes place at the end of the month of March or the beginning of the month of April. At Forest Heights, the exam has a 79.00% success rate for the students in the 10th grade. This is slightly below the average for the average Ontario-English student, which has a score of 82.00%.

See also
List of high schools in Ontario

References

External links
 Official school website

Waterloo Region District School Board
High schools in the Regional Municipality of Waterloo
Schools in Kitchener, Ontario
1964 establishments in Ontario
Educational institutions established in 1964